The 1970 Cincinnati Bengals season was the franchise's 1st season in the National Football League, and the 3rd overall. The NFL-AFL merger took place before the season and the Bengals, who were placed in the same division as the "old-guard NFL" Cleveland Browns and Pittsburgh Steelers, were not expected to be playoff contenders. Nevertheless, the Bengals made their first NFL campaign a memorable one. After winning their first ever game as a member of the NFL, their inaugural game in the brand new Riverfront Stadium, they would lose six games in a row. After the 1–6 start, however, the Bengals would win the rest of their games, rallying to an 8–6 finish and champions of the newly formed AFC Central division qualifying for their first playoff appearance in franchise history. In their first playoff game, they lost, 17–0, to the eventual Super Bowl-champion Baltimore Colts. Cincinnati quarterback Greg Cook was forced to the Injured Reserve list in training camp with a shoulder injury that would ultimately end his career; Virgil Carter took over as the starter. In just their third season, the 1970 Bengals set a league mark by being the first NFL expansion team to qualify for the playoffs within their first three seasons of existence. The team is one of only four teams since the 1970 merger to start the season 1–5 or worse and qualify for the playoffs, the others being the 2015 Kansas City Chiefs, the 2018 Indianapolis Colts, and the 2020 Washington Football Team.

Offseason

NFL Draft

Personnel

Staff / Coaches

Final roster

Regular season 

The Bengals set a league record for most points in a game scored by the special teams, with 31 in a 43–14 victory at Buffalo on November 8, 1970. Cornerback Lemar Parrish scored two special teams touchdowns: one on a 95-yard kickoff return, and another on an 83-yard return of a blocked field goal attempt. Parrish is the only Bengals player ever to score two touchdowns in a game on returns and/or recoveries — and he did it three times. Kicker Horst Muhlmann added 15 points on five field goals, and four extra points by Muhlmann completed the special teams onslaught. The offense scored only one touchdown, a one-yard run by running back Jess Phillips. The defense scored a touchdown on an eight-yard fumble return by defensive end Royce Berry.

Schedule

Standings

Season summary

Week 1 vs Raiders

Team stats

Team leaders 
 Passing: Virgil Carter (278 Att, 143 Comp, 1647 Yds, 51.4 Pct, 9 TD, 9 Int, 66.9 Rating)
 Rushing: Jess Phillips (163 Att, 648 Yds, 4.0 Avg, 76 Long, 4 TD)
 Receiving: Chip Myers (32 Rec, 542 Yds, 16.9 Avg, 56 Long, 1 TD)
 Scoring: Horst Muhlmann, 108 points (25 FG; 33 PAT)

Playoffs

Awards and records

Pro Bowl selections 
 CB Lemar Parrish
 TE Bob Trumpy

References

External links 
 1970 Cincinnati Bengals at Pro-Football-Reference.com

Cincinnati Bengals
Cincinnati Bengals seasons
AFC Central championship seasons
Cincinnati